NovaStor is a privately held software company based in Agoura Hills, California, with offices in Hamburg, Germany, and Zug, Switzerland.

The company's primary focus is providing backup and recovery software to home users, small and medium-sized businesses, and enterprises. NovaStor and its products are often compared to other backup and data protection solutions such as Symantec and EMC.

History
NovaStor was founded in 1987. In June 2009, it was bought out by a management-led investor group, which remains as the company's majority shareholder.

Products
NovaStor provides backup and recovery software for home users, businesses, and managed service providers. Their core focus is cloud and enterprise solutions, which provide technology for onsite and offsite backup and the deployment of cloud-based managed services.

NovaStor product features include:
 PC and server backup and restore
 Local and offsite backup and restore
 Tape and disk imaging software
 Disaster recovery
 Virtualization
 Cloud storage backup enablement
 Hard drive recovery and disk booting

See also
 List of backup software

References

External links
 

Software companies based in California
Technology companies based in Greater Los Angeles
Companies based in Agoura Hills, California
American companies established in 1987
Software companies established in 1987
1987 establishments in California
Private equity portfolio companies
Software companies of the United States